Charles (Chuck) Rainey (born July 14, 1954), is a former professional baseball player who pitched in the Major Leagues from 1979 to 1984.

Professional career
Rainey was drafted in the first round (19th overall) of the 1974 amateur draft by the Boston Red Sox and made his MLB debut on April 8, 1979, at Cleveland Stadium against the Indians. He spent four seasons on the Boston pitching staff before being traded to the Chicago Cubs for Doug Bird in December 1982. Rainey had his most successful season as a starter in 1983 with the Cubs, leading the rotation with 14 wins. On August 24 of that year, against the Cincinnati Reds at Wrigley Field, he had a no-hitter broken up with two out in the ninth by an Eddie Milner single, the only hit Rainey would allow in a 3–0 Cub victory. The no-hitter would have been the first by a Cub (and the first one the Cubs had been involved in) since Milt Pappas in 1972.

Midway through the 1984 season Rainey was traded (along with a player to be named later) to the Oakland Athletics for Davey Lopes. The Cubs later sent minor leaguer Damon Farmar to the Athletics, completing the trade. 

Rainey's final MLB appearance was on September 9, 1984, as the Indians downed the Athletics 7 - 5.

References

1954 births
Living people
Chicago Cubs players
Boston Red Sox players
Oakland Athletics players
Major League Baseball pitchers
Baseball players from San Diego
Bristol Red Sox players
Elmira Pioneers players
Pawtucket Red Sox players
Winston-Salem Red Sox players